Sir Henry Marks  (5 February 1861 – 5 June 1938) was an Australian-born Fijian politician, serving as a member of the Legislative Council of Fiji for over twenty years. Alongside Robert Crompton, John Maynard Hedstrom and Henry Milne Scott, he was one of the 'big four' that heavily influenced the Fijian economy and political sphere in the first half of the 20th century.

Biography
Marks was born in Melbourne, Victoria in 1861, the son of Jewish parents, Henry Marks and his wife, Mary (née Aaron or Heron), from Birmingham, England. He moved to Fiji at the age of 20, initially working as an import/export trader, before becoming a labour agent in New Caledonia, the New Hebrides and the Solomon Islands. When he returned to Fiji he established Henry Marks & Co, a merchant and commercial agency firm. He was involved in several other businesses, serving as chair of the board at Pacific Insurance and Sturt Ogilvie and as a director at Brown & Joske, Morris Hedstrom and Fiji Oil Mills. He married Annie Abrahams in 1883; the couple had three daughters and two sons. He joined the Fiji Volunteer Force when it was formed in 1898, initially holding the rank of a captain, before becoming a Major in 1902. In 1937, he was made Honorary Colonel of the Fiji Defence Force.

In 1905, Marks was elected to the Legislative Council for the Suva constituency in the first elections since 1871. Although he lost his seat in the 1908 elections, he returned to the Council following the 1911 elections, and was subsequently re-elected in 1914, 1917, 1920, 1923 and 1926. During his time in the Legislative Council, he also served on the Executive Council, and in the role of Commissioner of Currency, which he held from 1913 until 1929, was heavily involved in the introduction of the Fijian pound currency; as a result, his name was included on the banknotes for several years. Marks was also a longstanding member of Suva Municipal Council until retiring at the start of the 1930s, and served as the town's mayor from 1926 until 1930.

Following changes to the setup of the Legislative Council in 1929, Marks contested the Southern seat in the 1929 election, but was defeated by Henry Milne Scott and Alport Barker.

Marks was also involved in philanthropy, and donated £5,000 (plus another £5,000 from his company) to found the Colonial War Memorial Hospital in Suva, later also donating an x-ray machine to it. In the 1918 New Year Honours he was made a CBE; he was knighted in the 1933 Birthday Honours. Marks died in 1938.

References

1938 deaths
1861 births
Australian Jews
Australian people of English-Jewish descent
Fijian Jews
People from Melbourne
20th-century Fijian businesspeople
Commanders of the Order of the British Empire
Knights Bachelor
Members of the Legislative Council of Fiji
Members of the Executive Council of Fiji